Microphyura is a genus of gastropods belonging to the family Rhytididae.

The species of this genus are found in Southeastern Asia.

Species:

Microphyura cornea 
Microphyura denisi 
Microphyura jeanneneyi 
Microphyura microphis 
Microphyura nightingali

References

Rhytididae
Gastropod genera